Abbott Lawrence (December 16, 1792, Groton, Massachusetts – August 18, 1855) was a prominent American businessman, politician, and philanthropist. He was among the group of industrialists that founded a settlement on the Merrimack River that would later be named for him, Lawrence, Massachusetts.

Biography
Born in Groton, Massachusetts, the son of American Revolutionary War officer Samuel Lawrence, Abbott Lawrence attended Groton Academy (now the Lawrence Academy at Groton). Upon his graduation in 1808, Lawrence became an apprentice to his brother, Amos, as chief clerk in his brother's firm. On the conclusion of his apprenticeship, in 1814, the Lawrences formed a partnership, specializing in imports from Britain and China, and later expanded their interests to textile manufacturing. Initially called A. & A. Lawrence, the firm later was named A. & A. Lawrence and Co. It continued until Amos's death, and became the greatest wholesale mercantile house in the United States. It was successful even in the hard times of 1812-1815. In 1818, A. &. A Lawrence purchased 50 shares of the Suffolk Bank, a clearinghouse bank on State Street in Boston.

The firm did much for the establishment of the cotton textile industry in New England. In 1830, it came to the aid of financially distressed mills of Lowell, Massachusetts. In that year, the Suffolk, Tremont and Lawrence companies were established in Lowell, and Luther Lawrence, the eldest brother, represented the firm's interests there. When Amos retired from the business in 1831 due to ill health, Abbott became head of the firm.  In 1845–1847, the firm established and built up Lawrence, Massachusetts, named in honour of Abbott, who was a director of the Essex Company, which controlled the water power of Lawrence, and later was president of the Atlantic Cotton Mills and Pacific Mills there. Many cite the Lawrence brothers as the founders of New England's influential textile industry.

In 1819, Abbott Lawrence married Katherine Bigelow, the daughter of Timothy Bigelow and sister of John P. Bigelow. Their daughter, Katherine Bigelow Lawrence, married Augustus Lowell on June 1, 1854.

In the 1820s, Lawrence became a prominent public figure: a vocal supporter of railroad construction for economic benefit. He was an ardent protectionist, and represented Massachusetts at the Harrisburg protectionist convention in 1827. Lawrence was highly influential among Massachusetts Whigs. In 1834, he was elected US Representative as a Whig, serving in the 24th Congress. He did not seek re-election in 1836, but was elected again in 1838, serving in the 26th Congress. In 1840, he took an active part in the successful presidential campaign of William Henry Harrison. In 1842, he was appointed commissioner to settle the Northeastern Boundary Dispute between Canada and the United States. In 1844, he supported the campaign of Henry Clay and was a presidential elector. Lawrence was elected a member of the American Antiquarian Society in 1846, and subsequently was also elected a Fellow of the American Academy of Arts and Sciences in 1847.

In 1848, Lawrence was an unsuccessful candidate for party nomination as vice president on the Whig ticket, headed by Zachary Taylor. After Taylor's presidential victory, he offered Lawrence a choice of positions in the administration. Lawrence rejected a cabinet appointment, and chose the post of minister to Great Britain. He was involved in the negotiations of the Clayton–Bulwer Treaty, and resigned in October 1852. He returned to the United States to join the 1852 presidential campaign of Gen. Winfield Scott. However, he grew dissatisfied with the Whig stand on slavery, and abandoned the party.

Lawrence was active in Boston's Unitarian Church and donated money to various causes. He supported Lawrence Academy, affordable housing in Boston, and the Boston Public Library. He also provided $50,000 to establish the Lawrence Scientific School at Harvard College, and provided a similar sum in his will for the School. He died in Boston on August 18, 1855, aged 62, and was interred in Mount Auburn Cemetery, Cambridge, Massachusetts.

Notes

References
  Retrieved on 2008-02-15

External links

Businesspeople from Massachusetts
Philanthropists from Massachusetts
Harvard University people
Ambassadors of the United States to the United Kingdom
People from Groton, Massachusetts
Massachusetts National Republicans
Fellows of the American Academy of Arts and Sciences
1792 births
1855 deaths
Politicians from Lawrence, Massachusetts
Burials at Mount Auburn Cemetery
19th-century American diplomats
National Republican Party members of the United States House of Representatives
Whig Party members of the United States House of Representatives from Massachusetts
19th-century American politicians
Members of the American Antiquarian Society
19th-century American philanthropists
19th-century American businesspeople